Arístides Pertot  (born 24 September 1976 in Lanús) is a former Argentine footballer.

References

External links
 
 Argentine Primera statistics

1976 births
Living people
Sportspeople from Lanús
Argentine footballers
Association football midfielders
Veikkausliiga players
Deportivo Español footballers
Tampere United players
Turun Palloseura footballers
FC Inter Turku players
Club Atlético Temperley footballers
Argentine expatriate footballers
Expatriate footballers in Finland